is a retired Japanese figure skater. She is the 2006 Olympic champion and the 2004 World champion. Arakawa is the first Japanese skater to win an Olympic gold medal in figure skating and the second Japanese skater to win any Olympic medal in figure skating, after Midori Ito, who won silver in 1992. She is also the second Japanese woman to win a gold medal at the Winter Olympics, following skier Tae Satoya. She was the only Japanese medalist at the 2006 Winter Olympics.

Arakawa retired from competitive skating following her Olympic win and began skating professionally in ice shows and exhibitions. She also works as a skating sportscaster for Japanese television.

Personal life
Arakawa was born in Shinagawa, Tokyo, Japan, and grew up in Sendai and its suburbs. She is the only child of Koichi and Sachi Arakawa and was named Shizuka after Shizuka Gozen.

In March 2000, Arakawa enrolled at Waseda University  and graduated with a bachelor's degree in social sciences in 2004, while still competing as a skater. She won the 2004 World Figure Skating Championships days after completing her graduation examinations at Waseda University.

She lived and trained for a time at the International Skating Center of Connecticut in Simsbury, Connecticut after the closure of the Konami Sports Ice Rink in Sendai, where she began her career.

Her figure skating idols are Kristi Yamaguchi and Yuka Sato. She listens to music by Christina Aguilera, Beyoncé, Mai Kuraki (who is also a close friend of hers) and EXILE, and likes shopping, driving, swimming, golf and practicing marine sports. Arakawa cites gourmet cooking as one of her hobbies. She collects beanie babies, has a pet shih tzu (named Charo) and hamster (named Juntoki). She also has four dogs, named Choco, Tiramisu, Aroma and Rosa.

Arakawa was married on December 29, 2013, her 32nd birthday. Further details were not made public.

On April 16, 2014, Arakawa announced that she was pregnant and expecting her first child. On November 6, 2014, she gave birth to her daughter. On May 23, 2018, it was announced that she had given birth again to her son.

Career

Early career
When Arakawa was 5 years old, she became interested in skating and entered the Chibikko Skate School. She started ballet lessons at 7. While still 7, Arakawa began training with former Olympian Hiroshi Nagakubo, a pair skater who competed in the 1972 Winter Olympics in Sapporo, Japan. She was landing triple Salchows at age 8.

In 1994, she began participating in Japanese national skating competitions. She was named the 1994, 1995, 1996 All Japan Junior Figure athlete. Arakawa progressed through the Japanese ranks quickly and was the first skater in Japan to win three consecutive junior national titles.

Senior career

Arakawa was the senior national Japanese champion in both 1998 and 1999. She made her Olympic debut when she represented Japan in the 1998 Winter Olympics in Nagano at age 16. The Emperor and Empress of Japan attended the ladies' free skate event. She placed 13th at the Nagano Olympics. At that time, she was ranked number 2 in Japan. In 2002, Arakawa finished second at Japan's national championships and, as a result, was not named to the Japanese 2002 Winter Olympics team.

During the 2002–2003 skating season, Arakawa won the Asian Winter Games and the Winter Universiade. She earned her second consecutive silver medal at the Four Continents Championships. She took the bronze at the NHK Trophy, and placed fifth at the Cup of Russia. She qualified for the ISU Grand Prix Final, where she finished fourth. She later placed third at the Japanese Nationals, marking her fifth medal from this meet, with two golds and two silvers from previous seasons.

In 2004, she won the World Championships in Dortmund, Germany, after landing seven clean triple jumps. She was the third Japanese woman to win this title after Midori Ito who won in 1989 and Yuka Sato in 1994. Arakawa had planned to retire after the 2004 World Championships, but her victory there convinced her to change her plans.

At the 2005 World Championships, Arakawa finished 9th, a disappointment which she later credited as a motivation to stay in the sport and regain top form. She felt she could not quit on such a down note. In November 2005, Arakawa changed coaches to Nikolai Morozov.

2006 Winter Olympics

At the 2006 Winter Olympics in Turin, Italy, Arakawa skated in the short program to Fantaisie-Impromptu by Chopin. She went into the long program in third place, behind pre-event favorites Sasha Cohen and Irina Slutskaya. Less than a point separated the top three skaters. In the long program, Cohen was the first of the three leaders to skate, followed by Arakawa and Slutskaya. Cohen fell twice during her long program, leaving the door open to the other leaders.

Arakawa won the free program, skating to Vanessa Mae's Violin Fantasy on Puccini's Turandot by Giacomo Puccini. She performed an Ina Bauer and then did a three jump combination. "Ina Bauer" became a household word in Japan as a result. Although she had planned two triple-triple combinations for the free skate, she did not perform them, doing instead a triple Lutz-double loop and a triple Salchow-double toe loop combinations. Arakawa earned a total combined score of 191.34 points, almost eight points ahead of the second-place Cohen (183.36). Like Cohen, Slutskaya made mistakes in her long program, and ended up taking bronze, leaving Arakawa as the gold medal winner, which was also Japan's only medal of the 2006 games. Slutskaya was third at 181.44. At age 24, Arakawa became the oldest women's Olympic skating champion in more than 80 years. Florence "Madge" Cave Syers from the United Kingdom was the oldest when she won the Olympic title at age 27 at the 1908 Summer Olympics, which featured the first Olympic figure skating events.

After winning her Olympic title, Japanese Prime Minister Junichiro Koizumi called Arakawa in Turin, Italy to congratulate her. Koizumi said, "I cheered for you with excitement while I watched television. All the Japanese people are rejoicing. I give a perfect score to every bit of your performance."

Professional career
Arakawa retired after her Olympic victory. She continued to skate in ice shows and is a regular skating commentator on Japanese television. She competed at the 2006 Ice Wars on the World team. She also produces her own show, Friends on Ice, and is a recurring cast member at Fantasy on Ice, where she performed with Mai Kuraki to the charity song "Anata ga Irukara" in 2011 amongst others. Arakawa also does choreography.

In 2006, Arakawa appeared in a Japanese TV drama, Shichinin no onna bengoshi (7 female lawyers), presented by Asahi TV. She played the role of a cool public prosecutor, Yayoi Shimasaki, in the 8th episode.

She competed in an ABC skating series "Thin Ice," aired on March 19, 2010, paired with 2006 Olympic men's silver medallist Stéphane Lambiel. They came first in the viewer's votes, and ended the series in third place, winning a total of $45,000. They skated to the songs "Get Me Bodied" by Beyoncé and "Magic" by Robin Thicke.

On April 18, 2018, it was announced Arakawa was elected to the World Figure Skating Hall of Fame.

Signature moves

Arakawa is known for her jumping ability, particularly her difficult triple-triple combinations, like the triple Salchow-triple toe and the triple Lutz-triple toe, sometimes combined with a double loop. She has executed triple-triple-triple combinations in practice, the most of which have been the triple Salchow-triple toe-triple loop combination. She has also executed the triple Lutz-triple loop combination in practice.

Arakawa is known for the quietness of her blades. She is also a strong spinner. She has an excellent donut spin, a difficult variation of the Camel spin, that requires great flexibility. In 2004, she added a Biellmann spin to her repertoire. Arakawa's signature spiral is a Y-spiral where she releases her free leg and completes the spiral with her leg still close to her head, without the hand assist.

Her trademark move is the Ina Bauer with a full backbend. Due to Arakawa's use of this move during her free skate at the 2006 Olympics, the term "Ina Bauer" became very popular in Japan, and Arakawa's performance of it became iconic. The Ina Bauer move is often referred to in Japan by Arakawa's name.

Awards and honors
Japan Medals of Honor
 Purple Ribbon
Japanese Olympic Committee
 JOC Sports Award- Special Achievement Award (2002), Best Award (2005)
Municipality
 Miyagi "Citizens Award of Honor" (2006)

World Figure Skating Hall of Fame

 Class of 2018 inductee

Programs

Competitive highlights

GP: Grand Prix / Champions Series

Media appearances

DVD
 荒川静香 Moment Beautiful skating (2006) – 
 TORINO2006 日本女子 (2006) –

Book
 Tira mi su―だから私はがんばれる! (2006)- 
 金メダルへの道（2006）- 
 LEGEND OF THE ATHLETE荒川静香物語 (2007) –

References

External links 

 Shizuka-Arakawa.com
 International Skating Center of Connecticut in Simsbury
 
 Japan Skates – Website dedicated to the Japanese ladies figure skating team featuring news, rare photos and exclusive interviews

1981 births
People from Shinagawa
Living people
Japanese female single skaters
Waseda University alumni
Olympic figure skaters of Japan
Figure skaters at the 1998 Winter Olympics
Figure skaters at the 2006 Winter Olympics
Sportspeople from Sendai
Sportspeople from Tokyo
Olympic gold medalists for Japan
Olympic medalists in figure skating
World Figure Skating Championships medalists
Four Continents Figure Skating Championships medalists
Medalists at the 2006 Winter Olympics
Asian Games medalists in figure skating
Figure skaters at the 1999 Asian Winter Games
Figure skaters at the 2003 Asian Winter Games
Medalists at the 1999 Asian Winter Games
Medalists at the 2003 Asian Winter Games
Asian Games gold medalists for Japan
Asian Games silver medalists for Japan
Recipients of the Medal with Purple Ribbon
Universiade medalists in figure skating
Season-end world number one figure skaters
Figure skating commentators
Universiade gold medalists for Japan
Medalists at the 2003 Winter Universiade
Fantasy on Ice main cast members